The North Texas State Hospital (NTSH) is an inpatient mental health facility owned by the State of Texas and under the Texas Health and Human Service Commission's Health and Specialty Care System division. NTSH has three campuses, one in Wichita Falls and two in Vernon.

Wichita Falls campus
The Wichita Falls campus is a 330-bed facility that exists to treat people with mental illnesses and mental retardation after being screened by a local mental health facility (generally, a hospital or community mental health/mental retardation facility). It is Medicare certified. Although not a maximum security facility, the campus is guarded, and buildings (which are not guarded) are constantly locked with very limited access.The facility used to be open until a few years ago before the merge with formally Vernon State Hospital. Wichita Falls State Hospital was the name since 1922 and Vernon was added as an annex in the 1960s. Since the merge and the approx. $100,000 name change the hospital has become much more restricted and is no longer an open campus.

Vernon campus
The Vernon campus has 284 adult beds and 78 adolescent beds. It is a maximum-security facility that services adults with criminal (forensic) issues.

The Vernon campus was mandated by the 70th Texas Legislature to provide services to six populations:
Persons with felony charges who have been found incompetent to stand trial; 
Persons admitted for pre-trial evaluations for competency and issues of insanity; 
Persons found not guilty by reason of insanity; 
Persons from other state hospitals who have been found to be manifestly dangerous; 
Mentally disabled persons who have been found incompetent to stand trial on misdemeanor or felony charges; 
Persons from the Texas Department of Criminal Justice (TDCJ) and other jails who need inpatient psychiatric hospitalization. [The hospital has never been asked to fulfill this mandate as TDCJ developed its own psychiatric services.]

Vernon Campus South
In January 2018 the NTSH re-opened the Victory Field location to house adolescent with dually-diagnosed substance abuse and mental health problems most of whom are there as a condition of their probation, having had significant involvement with the juvenile justice system.

Accreditation
North Texas State Hospital is accredited by the Joint Commission on Accreditation of Healthcare Organizations (JCAHO).

Notable patients
Andrea Yates Vernon campus
Dena Schlosser
Dimitrios Pagourtzis

References

External links

 North Texas State Hospital - Texas Department of State Health Services

Psychiatric hospitals in Texas
Buildings and structures in Wichita Falls, Texas
Buildings and structures in Wilbarger County, Texas